The 2023 League of Ireland Premier Division, known as the SSE Airtricity League Premier Division for sponsorship reasons, is the 39th season of the League of Ireland Premier Division, the top Irish league for association football clubs since its establishment in 1985. Shamrock Rovers are the defending champions, having won their twentieth title the previous season.

Teams 
Ten teams compete in the league – the top nine teams from the previous season and the one team promoted from the First Division. The promoted team was Cork City, after a top flight absence of two years. They replaced Finn Harps who were relegated after four consecutive seasons in the top flight.

Stadiums and locations

Personnel and kits 

Note: Flags indicate national team as has been defined under FIFA eligibility rules. Players may hold more than one non-FIFA nationality.

League table

Standings

Positions by round

The table lists the positions of teams after each week of matches. In order to preserve chronological evolvements, any postponed matches are not included in the round at which they were originally scheduled but added to the full round they were played immediately afterward.

Results
Teams will play each other four times (twice at home, twice away).

Matches 1–18

Matches 19–36

Season statistics

Top scorers

   Assists

Clean sheets

Play-offs

Bracket

First Division play-off Semi-finals

First leg

Second leg

First Division play-off Final

Promotion/relegation play-off

Awards

Monthly awards

Annual awards

See also 

 2023 President of Ireland's Cup
 2023 FAI Cup
 2023 League of Ireland First Division
 2022–23 Leinster Senior Cup
 2023 Bohemian F.C. season
 2023 Dundalk F.C. season
 2023 Shelbourne F.C. season
 2023 St Patrick's Athletic F.C. season

References

External links 
 Soccerway
 UEFA

 
1
League of Ireland Premier Division seasons
1
Ireland
Ireland
Current association football seasons